Publius Septimius Geta was a Roman emperor.

Publius Septimius Geta also may refer to:
Publius Septimius Geta (father of Septimius Severus)
Publius Septimius Geta (brother of Septimius Severus)